Olivia Grace Di Bacco (born 4 August 1992) is a Canadian freestyle wrestler. She is a three-time medalist, including gold in 2017, at the Pan American Wrestling Championships. At the 2019 Pan American Games held in Lima, Peru, she won the silver medal in the 68 kg event.

Career 

At the Pan American Wrestling Championships, she won the gold medal in 2017 and one of the bronze medals both in 2019 and 2020.

In March 2021, she won one of the bronze medals in the 68 kg event at the Matteo Pellicone Ranking Series 2021 held in Rome, Italy. In October 2021, she lost her bronze medal match in the 68 kg event at the 2021 World Wrestling Championships held in Oslo, Norway.

Achievements

References

External links 
 

Living people
1992 births
Place of birth missing (living people)
Canadian female sport wrestlers
Pan American Games medalists in wrestling
Pan American Games bronze medalists for Canada
Wrestlers at the 2019 Pan American Games
Medalists at the 2019 Pan American Games
Pan American Wrestling Championships medalists
20th-century Canadian women
21st-century Canadian women